George Harold Wheeler (19 February 1910 – 1995) was a Welsh amateur footballer who played in the Football League for Newport County as a left back. He was capped by Wales at amateur level.

References 

Welsh footballers
English Football League players
Wales amateur international footballers
Association football fullbacks
1910 births
Footballers from Newport, Wales
1995 deaths
Place of death missing
Newport County A.F.C. players